Arsos is a village in Cyprus, about  east of Nicosia.  De facto, it is under the control of Northern Cyprus.

The construction of a road from Arsos to Pyla is one of the conditions that Northern Cyprus requested of Cyprus in return for the opening of the Limnitis crossing. A golden necklace was found in the village.

References

Communities in Larnaca District
Populated places in Lefkoşa District